Natural disasters in China are the result of several different natural hazards that affect the country according to its particular geographic and geologic features affecting both humans and animals.

Perception of disasters

Natural disasters reveal the traditional view of disasters as divine retribution: tian zai (天災), literally 'heavenly disaster'.

In ancient beliefs, natural disasters were seen as Heaven's response to immoral human behaviour, whereby the conduct of different individuals carried different weights. While the behaviour of common people ranked last, the actions of bureaucrats had a greater effect. Given that in Imperial China the emperor's behaviour was believed to be the most important, popular belief was that the emperor should attempt to prevent disasters by ensuring his conduct was in following with moral codes – and if a disaster should occur, he was responsible for addressing the consequences. According to the Overseas Development Institute, the state-led nature of humanitarian aid in today's China traces back to these traditional beliefs. Chinese believed that natural disasters would foretell the end of a dynasty or the death of a great leader.

This concept of cosmic linkage between natural disasters and human conduct was radically rejected at the height of Maoist years when nature was represented as ‘an enemy to be overcome, an adversary to be brought to heel’. Propaganda posters were produced with the slogan, "Earthquakes cannot frighten us, the people will certainly conquer nature."

Types

Earthquakes

The People's Republic of China established a National Earthquake Administration in 1971 to take charge of monitoring, research, and emergency response for earthquakes.  It was renamed China Earthquake Administration (CEA) in 1998, mandated by the Earthquake prevention and Disaster Reduction Act of PRC under the State Council.  Each provincial, autonomous regional, and centrally administrated municipal government also has its own earthquake administration that is under the direction of CEA.

Famine

Among the famines in China, the worst ever was the Great Chinese Famine.

Fire

Flood

 1851–1855 Yellow River floods
 1931 China floods
 1935 Yangtze flood
 Eastern China flood of 1991
 Shalan Town flood of 2005
 2007 Shandong coal mine flood
 2009 Luoding flood
 2010 China floods
 2011 China floods
 July 2012 Beijing flood
 2013 China–Russia floods
 2013 Southwest China floods
 2017 China floods
 2020 China floods
 2021 China floods
 2022 China floods

Plague

Emergency management
The National Disaster Reduction Center (NDRC) of the Ministry of Civil Affairs (MCA) is a specialized agency under the Chinese Government engaged in information services and supporting decisions on various natural disasters. It provides reference for disaster-management departments in their decision-making and technical support for China's disaster-reduction undertakings by way of collecting and analyzing disaster information, assessing disasters and emergency relief, and analyzing and studying disasters using such advanced technology as satellite remote sensing.

See also
 Climate change in China

References

External links
National Disaster Reduction Center (NDRC), PRC
Ministry of Civil Affairs (MCA), PRC
China mulls emergency management law, PRC government web portal